Coming out is a 2013 Hungarian comedy film directed by Dénes Orosz.

Plot
"Coming Out" is the story of Erik (Sándor Csányi), a radio personality, gay activist, and Hungary's most famous openly gay male celebrity. As Erik is preparing to marry his partner Balázs (Gábor Karalyos), he is shocked to discover he has a growing sexual attraction to women.

After experiencing an injury during a motorcycle accident, Erik gradually discovers that he is attracted to women and falls in love with Linda, his physician. His new-found attraction to Linda causes Erik to doubt whether he should go ahead with his marriage to Balázs.

Cast 
 Sándor Csányi – Erik
 Kátya Tompos – Linda
  – Balázs
 Anikó Für – Júlia
 József Gyabronka – Kálmán
 Klára Nényei – Fanni
 Zoltán Mucsi – Pecsák
 Katalin Takács – Mother

References

External links 

2013 romantic comedy films
2013 films
2013 LGBT-related films
Gay-related films
Hungarian LGBT-related films
Male bisexuality in film
Hungarian romantic comedy films